Ceroplesis intermedia is a species of beetle in the family Cerambycidae. It was described by Per Olof Christopher Aurivillius in 1925. It is known from Tanzania and Kenya.

References

intermedia
Beetles described in 1925